Nuenglanlek is a Thai Muay Thai fighter. He is a former Lumpinee Stadium 130 lbs champion, and the 2019 Lumpinee Stadium Fighter of the Year.

Muay Thai career
Nuenglanlek defeated Yodthongthai Sor.Sommai by unanimous decision in August 2016.

He fought Kulabdam Sor.Jor.Piek-U-Thai in May 2018 at the Lumpini Stadium. Nuenglanlek lost the fight by a unanimous decision.

Nuenglanlek lost a decision to Sangmanee Sor Tienpo in November 2018.

In December 2018 Nenglanked fought a rematch with Tawanchai PK Saenchaimuaythaigym at the Lumpini Stadium. Tawanchai won the fight by a fifth round TKO.

In February 2019 Nuenglanlek fought a rematch with Kulabdam Sor.Jor.Piek-U-Thai. He won the fight by a fourth round head kick KO.

He won a unanimous decision against Chujaroen Dabransarakarm in February 2020.

Nuenglanlek fought Tawanchai PK Saenchaimuaythaigym once again in August 2020. Tawanchai won the fight by a unanimous decision.

In November 2020, Nuenglanlek signed a 3-year sponsorship deal with Yokkao, becoming part of the Yokkao Fight Team.

Titles and accomplishments
Lumpinee Stadium
 2016 Lumpinee Stadium 130 lbs Champion
 2019 Lumpinee Stadium Fighter of the Year
 2019 Lumpinee Stadium Fight of the Year (vs Kulabdam Sor.Jor.Piek-U-Thai)
Siam Omnoi Stadium
 2018 Omnoi Stadium 135 lbs Champion

Awards
 2019 Siam Kela Fighter of the Year
 2019 Wan Muay Thai Awards Fighter of the Year
 2019 Wan Muay Thai Awards Fight of the Year (vs Kulabdam Sor.Jor.Piek-U-Thai)

Fight record

|-  style="background:#fbb;"
| 2023-03-11|| Loss ||align=left| Capitan Petchyindee Academy || RWS + Petchyindee, Rajadamnern Stadium || Bangkok, Thailand || Decision (Unanimous) || 3 ||3:00 

|- style="background:#cfc" 
| 2023-02-11 || Win ||align="left" | Award ChokdeeGym || Rajadamnern World Series + Petchyindee  || Bangkok, Thailand || Decision (unanimous)||3 || 3:00
 |- style="background:#fbb" 
| 2022-12-16 || Loss ||align="left" | Elbrus VenumMuayThai || Rajadamnern World Series || Bangkok, Thailand || KO (Spinning back elbow) || 3 || 0:48
|-  style="background:#cfc;"
| 2022-05-12 || Win ||align=left| Chujaroen Dabransarakarm ||Petchyindee, Rajadamnern Stadium || Bangkok, Thailand || Decision || 5 || 3:00
|-  style="background:#cfc;"
| 2022-03-03 || Win ||align=left| Chamuaktong Fightermuaythai|| Petchyindee, Rajadamnern Stadium || Bangkok, Thailand || Decision || 5 || 3:00

|-  style="background:#fbb;"
| 2021-11-16 || Loss ||align=left| Ferrari Fairtex|| Lumpinee GoSport + Kiatpetch, Lumpinee Stadium|| Bangkok, Thailand || Decision || 5 ||3:00
|-  style="background:#c5d2ea;"
| 2021-03-26|| Draw ||align=left| Capitan PetchyindeeAcademy || Muaymumwansuk True4u, Rangsit Stadium || Rangsit, Thailand || Decision || 5 || 3:00
|-  style="background:#cfc;"
| 2020-12-18|| Win ||align=left| Tapaokaew Singmawynn || Suk Singmawin || Songkhla, Thailand || TKO (Doctor stoppage/cut) || 3 ||
|-  style="background:#fbb;"
| 2020-10-09||Loss||align=left|  Chujaroen Dabransarakarm || True4U Muaymanwansuk, Rangsit Stadium || Rangsit, Thailand ||Decision||  5|| 3:00
|-  style="background:#fbb;"
| 2020-08-16|| Loss||align=left| Tawanchai PK Saenchaimuaythaigym || Channel 7 Boxing Stadium || Bangkok, Thailand || Decision || 5 || 3:00
|-  style="background:#cfc;"
| 2020-02-09||Win ||align=left|  Chujaroen Dabransarakarm ||Srithammaracha + Kiatpetch Super Fight || Nakhon Si Thammarat, Thailand ||Decision||  5|| 3:00
|-  style="background:#cfc;"
| 2019-12-23|| Win ||align=left|  Yodlekpet Or. Pitisak ||Rajadamnern Stadium || Bangkok, Thailand ||Decision (Unanimous)|| 5 || 3:00
|-  style="background:#cfc;"
| 2019-11-07|| Win ||align=left| Muangthai PKSaenchaimuaythaigym|| Ruamponkon Prachin ||Prachinburi, Thailand|| KO (Elbow) || 4 ||
|-  style="background:#cfc;"
| 2019-10-05||Win||align=left| Kulabdam Sor.Jor.Piek-U-Thai || Yod Muay Thai Naikhanomton || Buriram, Thailand || TKO (Knees to the body)|| 4 ||
|-  style="background:#cfc;"
| 2019-07-04|| Win ||align=left|  Yodlekpet Or. Pitisak ||Rajadamnern Stadium || Bangkok, Thailand || Decision (Unanimous)|| 5 || 3:00
|-  style="background:#fbb;"
| 2019-05-10|| Loss ||align=left| Kulabdam Sor.Jor.Piek-U-Thai || Lumpinee Stadium || Bangkok, Thailand || Decision || 5 || 3:00
|-  style="background:#cfc;"
| 2019-03-27 || Win ||align=left| Muangthai PKSaenchaimuaythaigym || Parunchai Birthday || Thung Song, Thailand || KO (Elbow) || 2 ||
|-  style="background:#cfc;"
| 2019-02-12|| Win||align=left| Kulabdam Sor.Jor.Piek-U-Thai || Lumpinee Stadium || Bangkok, Thailand || KO (Right high kick) || 4 ||
|-  style="background:#fbb;"
| 2018-12-07|| Loss ||align=left| Tawanchai PK Saenchaimuaythaigym || Lumpinee Stadium || Bangkok, Thailand || TKO || 5 || 0:40
|-  style="background:#fbb;"
| 2018-11-08|| Loss ||align=left| Sangmanee Sor Tienpo || Rajadamnern Stadium || Bangkok, Thailand || Decision || 5 || 3:00
|-  style="background:#cfc;"
| 2018-09-06|| Win ||align=left| Panpayak Sitchefboontham || Rajadamnern Stadium || Bangkok, Thailand || Decision || 5 || 3:00
|-  style="background:#fbb;"
| 2018-07-10|| Loss ||align=left| Tawanchai PK Saenchaimuaythaigym || Lumpinee Stadium || Bangkok, Thailand || Decision || 5 || 3:00
|-  style="background:#cfc;"
| 2018-06-16 || Win ||align=left| Extra Sitworapat || Siam Omnoi Stadium || Bangkok, Thailand || Decision || 5 || 3:00 
|- 
! style=background:white colspan=9 |
|-
|-  style="background:#fbb;"
| 2018-05-01|| Loss ||align=left| Kulabdam Sor.Jor.Piek-U-Thai || Lumpinee Stadium || Bangkok, Thailand || Decision || 5 || 3:00
|-  style="background:#cfc;"
| 2018-03-17 || Win ||align=left| Kaimukkao Por.Thairongruangkamai || Siam Omnoi Stadium || Bangkok, Thailand || KO || 3 || 
|- 
! style=background:white colspan=9 |
|-  style="background:#fbb;"
| 2018-02-08 || Loss ||align=left| Kaimukkao Por.Thairongruangkamai ||  || Thailand || Decision || 5 || 3:00
|- style="background:#cfc;"
| 2017-12-29 || Win ||align=left| Rodlek Jaotalaytong || Suk Jaotalaythong+Piyuphabaimahakosol || Surat Thani Province, Thailand || Decision || 5 || 3:00
|-  style="background:#cfc;"
| 2017-11-09 || Win ||align=left| Kaimukkao Por.Thairongruangkamai || Rajadamnern Stadium || Bangkok, Thailand || Decision || 5 || 3:00
|-  style="background:#fbb;"
| 2017-09-09 || Loss ||align=left| Phet Utong Or. Kwanmuang ||  || Thailand || TKO || 4 ||
|-  style="background:#cfc;"
| 2017-07-31 || Win ||align=left| Extra Sor.Sirilak || Rajadamnern Stadium || Bangkok, Thailand || Decision || 5 || 3:00
|-  style="background:#cfc;"
| 2017-06-27 || Win ||align=left| Petnamngam Or.Kwanmuang || Rajadamnern Stadium || Bangkok, Thailand || Decision || 5 || 3:00
|-  style="background:#cfc;"
| 2017-05-31 || Win ||align=left| Design Rachanon || Rajadamnern Stadium || Bangkok, Thailand || TKO || 4 ||
|-  style="background:#c5d2ea;"
| 2017-05-02 || Draw ||align=left| Sakchainoi M.U.Den ||  || Mueang Krabi District, Thailand || Decision || 5 || 3:00
|-  style="background:#fbb;"
| 2017-03-29 || Loss ||align=left| Extra Sor.Sirilak || Rajadamnern Stadium || Bangkok, Thailand || Decision || 5 || 3:00
|-  style="background:#fbb;"
| 2017-03-07 || Loss ||align=left| Phetmorakot Teeded99 || Rajadamnern Stadium || Bangkok, Thailand || KO (High Kick)||  ||
|-  style="background:#fbb;"
| 2017-01-26 || Loss ||align=left| Petnamngam Or.Kwanmuang || Rajadamnern Stadium || Bangkok, Thailand || Decision || 5 || 3:00
|-  style="background:#fbb;"
| 2016-12-09 || Loss ||align=left| Phetmorakot Teeded99 || Lumpinee Stadium || Bangkok, Thailand || Decision || 5 || 3:00
|- 
! style=background:white colspan=9 |
|-  style="background:#fbb;"
| 2016-10-04 || Loss ||align=left| Kaonar P.K.SaenchaiMuaythaiGym || Lumpinee Stadium || Bangkok, Thailand || Decision || 5 || 3:00
|-  style="background:#cfc;"
| 2016-08-30 || Win ||align=left| Yodthongthai Sor.Sommai ||  || Songkhla Province, Thailand || Decision || 5 || 3:00
|-  style="background:#cfc;"
| 2016-08-05 || Win ||align=left| Jamsak Sakburirum || Lumpinee Stadium || Bangkok, Thailand || Decision || 5 || 3:00
|- 
! style=background:white colspan=9 |
|-  style="background:#fbb;"
| 2016-06-24 || Loss ||align=left| Saen Parunchai || Central Stadium || Songkhla, Thailand || Decision || 5 || 3:00
|-  style="background:#cfc;"
| 2016-06-02 || Win ||align=left| Kongdanai Sor.Sommai || Rajadamnern Stadium || Bangkok, Thailand || Decision || 5 || 3:00
|-  style="background:#fbb;"
| 2016-04-24 || Loss ||align=left| Rodlek Jaotalaytong || Channel 7 Boxing Stadium || Thailand || Decision || 5 || 3:00
|- 
! style=background:white colspan=9 |
|-  style="background:#fbb;"
| 2016-03-02 || Loss ||align=left| Rodlek Jaotalaytong || Rajadamnern Stadium || Thailand || TKO || 2 ||
|-  style="background:#cfc;"
| 2016-01-29 || Win ||align=left| Grandprixnoi Pitakpaphadeang || Lumpinee Stadium || Thailand || Decision || 5 || 3:00
|-  style="background:#c5d2ea;"
| 2015-11-10 || Draw ||align=left| Grandprixnoi Pitakpaphadeang || Rajadamnern Stadium || Bangkok, Thailand || Decision || 5 || 3:00
|-  style="background:#cfc;"
| 2015-10-13 || Win ||align=left| Yok Parunchai || Lumpinee Stadium  || Bangkok, Thailand || Decision || 5 || 3:00
|-  style="background:#fbb;"
| 2015-09-20 || Loss ||align=left| Yok Parunchai || Channel 7 Boxing Stadium  || Bangkok, Thailand || Decision || 5 || 3:00
|-  style="background:#cfc;"
| 2015-08-24 || Win ||align=left| Yimsiam Pangkongprab ||  || Nakhon Si Thammarat, Thailand || Decision || 5 || 3:00
|-  style="background:#cfc;"
| 2015-05-31 || Win ||align=left| Sirimongkol PK Saenchaimuaythaigym || Rajadamnern Stadium || Bangkok, Thailand || Decision || 5 || 3:00
|-  style="background:#cfc;"
| 2015-04-27 || Win ||align=left| Fasatan Sitwatcharachai || Rangsit Boxing Stadium || Rangsit, Thailand || Decision || 5 || 3:00
|-  style="background:#cfc;"
| 2015-02-15 || Win ||align=left| Kaow-A Kiatcharoenchai || Channel 7 Boxing Stadium || Bangkok, Thailand || TKO || 4 ||
|-  style="background:#cfc;"
| 2014-12-11 || Win ||align=left| Phalaphon Pumphanmuang || Lumpinee Stadium || Bangkok, Thailand || KO || 2 ||
|-  style="background:#cfc;"
| 2014-10-12 || Win ||align=left| Kaow-A Sitpholek || Channel 7 Boxing Stadium || Bangkok, Thailand || Decision || 5 || 3:00
|-  style="background:#cfc;"
| 2013-11-23 || Win ||align=left| Posailek Pagonponsurin || Ladprao Stadium || Bangkok, Thailand || KO (Elbow) ||  || 
|-
| colspan=9 | Legend:

See also
 List of male kickboxers

References

1995 births
Living people
Nuenglanlek Jitmuangnon
Bantamweight kickboxers
Nuenglanlek Jitmuangnon